Satbarwa block is one of the administrative blocks of Palamu district, Jharkhand state, India. It is one of the important block/Taliuka in NH-75 (old numbering). According to census (2001), the block has 9,385 households with aggregate population of 52,541. The block has 58 villages.

See also
 Palamu Loksabha constituency
 Jharkhand Legislative Assembly
 Jharkhand
 Palamu

References
Blocks of Palamu district

Community development blocks in Jharkhand
Community development blocks in Palamu district